This article shows the rosters of all participating teams at the men's baseball tournament at the 2015 Pan American Games in Toronto. Rosters can have a maximum of 24 athletes.

Canada announced their squad on June 17, 2015. The position of the player is listed in parentheses.

Andrew Albers (P)
Phillippe Aumont (P)
Shane Dawson (P)
Kellin Deglan (C)
Bryan Dykxhoorn (P)
Jeff Francis (P)
Tyson Gillies (OF)
Shawn Hill (P)
Jesse Hodges (INF)
Sean Jamieson (INF)
Brock Kjeldgaard (OF)
Jordan Lennerton (INF)
Chris Leroux (P)
Kyle Lotzkar (P)
Jared Mortensen (P)
Tyler O'Neill (INF)
Pete Orr (INF)
Jasvir Rakkar (P)
Scott Richmond (P)
Chris Robinson (C)
Evan Rutckyj (P)
Tim Smith (OF)
Skyler Stromsmoe (INF)
Rene Tosoni (OF)

The following is Colombia's men's baseball team for the 2015 Pan American Games. The position of the player is listed in parentheses.

Carlos Willoughby (U)
Charlie Mirabal (IF/OF)
Ronald Luna (IF/OF)
Harold Rumion (P)
Efrain Contreras (IF/OF)
Sneider Batista (IF/OF)
Diover Avila (OF)
Jonathan Lozada (U)
Ismael Castro (IF/OF)
Hector Acuna (IF/OF)
Harold Ramirez (IF/OF)
Randy Consuegra (P)
Yesid Salazar (P)
Jayson De Aguas (C/IF)
Jorge Ariza (C/IF)
Karl Triana (P)
Tito Polo (IF/OF)
Dumas Garcia (P)
Steve Brown (IF/OF)
Ronald Ramirez (P)
Nabil Crismatt (P)
Juan Corpas (P)
Javier Ortiz (P)
Cristian Mendoza (P)

Cuba's men's baseball team for the 2015 Pan American Games is listed below. The position of the player is listed in parentheses.

Roel Santos (OF)
Raul Gonzalez (OF/IF)
Rudy Reyes (OF/IF)
Yosvany Alarcón (C)
Freddy Álvarez (P)
Urmaris Guerra (OF)
Ismel Jiménez (P)
Frederich Cepeda (IF)
Yander Guevara (P)
Jose Garcia (OF)
Héctor Mendoza (P)
Yorbis Borroto (IF)
Yordan Manduley (IF)
Frank Morejón (C)
Erly Casanova (P)
Alfredo Despaigne (OF)
Alexander Malleta (IF)
Yosbany Torres (P)
Yoennis Yera (P)
Yulexis La Rosa (C)
William Saavedra (IF)
Lazaro Blanco (P)
Livan Moinelo (P)
Yennier Canó (P)

The Dominican Republic announced their squad on June 19, 2015. The position of the player is listed in parentheses.

Ruben Sosa (OF)
Yeixon Ruiz (OF)
Jordy Lara (INF)
Aneury Tavarez (OF)
Ronny Rodríguez (INF)
Pedro Feliz (INF)
Víctor Méndez (INF)
Mayobanex Acosta (C)
Angelo Mora (INF)
Claudio Vargas (P)
Pedro de los Santos (P)
Miguel Fermin (P)
Jonathan Galvez (INF)
Mario Mercedes (C)
Leonel Santiago (P)
Willy Lebrón (P)
Kelvin Jiménez (P)
Luis Liria (P)
Pedro López
Manuel Mayorson (INF)
Adalberto Méndez (P)
Roberto Novoa (P)
Kelvin Pérez (P)
Roberto Gómez (P)

The following is Nicaragua's men's baseball team for the 2015 Pan American Games. The position of the player is listed in parentheses.

Dwight Britton (OF)
Jorge Bucardo (P)
Ofilio Castro (INF)
Wiston Davila (C)
Berman Espinoza (P)
Samuel Estrada (P)
Ramon Flores (OF)
Elvin Garcia (P)
Ronald Garth (INF)
Sandor Guido (INF)
Gerardo Juarez (P)
Darrel Leiva (P)
Darrel Campbell Lewis (INF)
Ivan Marin (INF)
Gustavo Martinez (P)
Janior Montes (C)
Renato Morales (OF)
Vicente Padilla (P)
Justo Rivas (OF)
Arnold Rizo (OF)
Jose Saenz (P)
Douglas Solis (P)
Carlos Teller (P)
Junior Tellez (P)

The following is Puerto Rico's men's baseball team for the 2015 Pan American Games. The position of the player is listed in parentheses.

Richard Gonzalez (INF)
Roberto Pena (C)
Gabriel Robles (INF)
Ramesis Rosa (P)
Aldo Mendez (OF)
Jeffry Dominguez (INF)
Jose Ayala (P)
Edgardo Baez (OF)
Miguel Martinez (P)
Joiset Feliciano (OF)
Raul Rivera (P)
Richard Thon (IF)
Luis Cintron (P)
Nelson Gomez (IF)
Roy Geiger (P)
Anthony Garcia (OF)
Tomas Santiago (P)
Andrés Santiago (P)
Luis Ramos (P)
Yomar Cruz (C)
Luis Gonzalez (P)
Hector Ponce (OF)
Jose Soler (P)
Beningno Cepeda (P)

The United States announced their squad on June 29, 2015. The position of the player is listed in parentheses.

Albert Almora (OF)
Jake Barrett (P)
Buddy Baumann (P)
Jeff Bianchi (IF/OF)
Aaron Blair (P)
Brian Bogusevic (OF)
Casey Coleman (P)
Zach Eflin (P)
Brian Ellington (P)
Cam Gallagher (C)
Josh Hader (P)
David Huff (P)
Travis Jankowski (OF)
Patrick Kivlehan (OF)
Casey Kotchman (IF)
Scott McGregor (P)
Tommy Murphy (C)
Andy Parrino (INF)
Tyler Pastornicky (INF)
Paul Sewald (P)
Nate Smith (P)
Jake Thompson (P)
Johnathan Williamson (OF)
Jacob Wilson (INF)

References

Baseball at the 2015 Pan American Games
2015 in baseball
Baseball tournament squads